Pitcher Plants of the Old World is a two-volume monograph by Stewart McPherson on the pitcher plants of the genera Nepenthes and Cephalotus. It was published in May 2009 by Redfern Natural History Productions and covers all species known at the time. The work was edited by Alastair Robinson and Andreas Fleischmann.

The monograph was followed in 2011 by New Nepenthes: Volume One, a supplementary work covering the many Nepenthes taxa documented in the preceding few years.

Background
In an interview with The Hoopoe, McPherson explained his reasons for writing the book and the extensive field work that it involved:

I prepared Pitcher Plants of the Old World in response to the lack of available information on dozens of species of Nepenthes. Since many species of Nepenthes are not in cultivation, and also because there is often confusion concerning those that are, I resolved to study and photograph each species of Nepenthes and Cephalotus  in the wild, in order to document each adequately. After graduating from university in 2006 at the age of 23, I began three years of intense research focusing on Nepenthes and Cephalotus, and spent a cumulative total of eighteen months in the field. Over the last three years, I climbed over one hundred mountains across Southeast Asia in search of species of Nepenthes. Many of these journeys were relatively simple, lasting just a few days or less. Others required more extensive effort, and in a few cases, I spent more than one week to find a single Nepenthes taxon.

Content
The book gives a detailed account of the singular Cephalotus follicularis as well as 120 species of Nepenthes, including one described for the first time (N. micramphora). A further five "incompletely diagnosed taxa" are included: N. sp. Misool, N. sp. Papua (later identified as N. lamii), N. sp. Phanga Nga (later described as N. mirabilis var. globosa), N. sp. Sulawesi (later described as N. nigra), and N. sp. Trang (later described as N. kerrii). Nepenthes hamiguitanensis—which would be described in McPherson's next book, Carnivorous Plants and their Habitats—is treated here as a natural hybrid between N. micramphora and N. peltata.

Species
In addition to Cephalotus follicularis, the following 120 species and 5 undescribed taxa of Nepenthes are covered in the book.

 N. adnata
 N. alata
 N. alba
 N. albomarginata
 N. ampullaria
 N. angasanensis
 N. argentii
 N. aristolochioides
 N. attenboroughii
 N. beccariana
 N. bellii
 N. benstonei
 N. bicalcarata
 N. bokorensis
 N. bongso
 N. boschiana
 N. burbidgeae
 N. burkei
 N. campanulata
 N. chaniana
 N. clipeata
 N. copelandii
 N. danseri
 N. deaniana
 N. densiflora
 N. diatas
 N. distillatoria
 N. dubia
 N. edwardsiana
 N. ephippiata
 N. eustachya
 N. eymae
 N. faizaliana
 N. flava
 N. fusca
 N. glabrata
 N. glandulifera
 N. gracilis
 N. gracillima
 N. gymnamphora
 N. hamata
 N. hirsuta
 N. hispida
 N. hurrelliana
 N. inermis
 N. insignis
 N. izumiae
 N. jacquelineae
 N. jamban
 N. junghuhnii
 N. kampotiana
 N. khasiana
 N. klossii
 N. kongkandana
 N. lamii
 N. lavicola
 N. lingulata 
 N. longifolia
 N. lowii
 N. macfarlanei
 N. macrophylla
 N. macrovulgaris
 N. madagascariensis
 N. mantalingajanensis
 N. mapuluensis
 N. masoalensis
 N. maxima
 N. merrilliana
 N. micramphora
 N. mikei
 N. mindanaoensis
 N. mira
 N. mirabilis
 N. mollis
 N. muluensis
 N. murudensis
 N. naga
 N. neoguineensis
 N. northiana
 N. ovata
 N. paniculata
 N. papuana
 N. peltata
 N. pervillei
 N. petiolata
 N. philippinensis
 N. pilosa
 N. pitopangii
 N. platychila
 N. rafflesiana
 N. rajah
 N. ramispina
 N. reinwardtiana
 N. rhombicaulis
 N. rigidifolia
 N. rowanae
 N. sanguinea
 N. saranganiensis
 N. sibuyanensis
 N. singalana
 N. smilesii
 N. spathulata
 N. spectabilis
 N. stenophylla
 N. sumatrana
 N. surigaoensis
 N. talangensis
 N. tenax
 N. tentaculata
 N. tenuis
 N. thorelii
 N. tobaica
 N. tomoriana
 N. treubiana
 N. truncata
 N. veitchii
 N. ventricosa
 N. vieillardii
 N. villosa
 N. vogelii

Incompletely diagnosed taxa
 N. sp. Misool
 N. sp. Papua (N. lamii)
 N. sp. Phanga Nga (N. mirabilis var. globosa)
 N. sp. Sulawesi (N. nigra)
 N. sp. Trang (N. kerrii)

Reviews
The book has been praised for its scope, detail, and high quality photographs. In their review for the journal Phytotaxa, Maarten J. M. Christenhusz and Michael F. Fay wrote:

This is to date the only publication dealing with the genus Nepenthes throughout its geographical range. He [McPherson] humbly refers the reader to other taxonomic works, but these are all regional treatments. The level of information provided on all the species of Nepenthes is outstanding and has no precedent.

References

External links
 Photographs from the book

Nepenthes literature
2009 non-fiction books